Hypochaeris radicata (sometimes spelled Hypochoeris radicata) – also known as catsear, flatweed, cat's-ear, hairy cat's ear, or false dandelion – is a perennial, low-lying edible herb often found in lawns.  The plant is native to Europe, but has also been introduced to the Americas, Japan, Australia, and New Zealand, where it can be an invasive weed. It is listed as a noxious weed in the northwestern U.S. state of Washington.

Botany 

The leaves, which may grow up to eight inches (20 cm) long, are lobed and covered in coarse hairs, forming a low-lying rosette around a central taproot.  Forked stems carry bright yellow flower heads, and when mature these form seeds attached to windborne "parachutes".  All parts of the plant exude a milky sap when cut.

Hypochaeris species are used as food plants by the larvae of some Lepidoptera species including the shark moth.

Etymology and differences from dandelions 

Its name is derived from Greek ὑπό 'under' and χοῖρος 'young pig'. Thus the name "should" be spelled Hypochoeris.
The adjective radicata means 'with conspicuous roots' in Latin (derived from radix 'root').

In English, catsear is derived from the words cat's ear, and refers to the shape and fine hair on the leaves resembling that of the ear of a cat.

The plant is also known as false dandelion because it is commonly mistaken for true dandelions. Both plants carry similar flowers which form  windborne seeds. However, catsear flowering stems are forked and solid, whereas dandelions possess unforked stems that are hollow. Both plants have a rosette of leaves and a central taproot. The leaves of dandelions are jagged in appearance, whereas those of catsear are more lobe-shaped and hairy. Both plants have similar uses.

Culinary uses 

All parts of the catsear plant are edible; however, the leaves and roots are those most often harvested. The leaves are bland in taste but can be eaten raw in salads, steamed, or used in stir-fries. Some recommend mixing them with other vegetables. Older leaves can become tough and fibrous, but younger leaves are suitable for consumption. In contrast to the edible leaves of dandelion, catsear leaves only rarely have some bitterness.

The root can be roasted and ground to form a coffee substitute.

Toxicity 

This species is suspected of causing stringhalt in horses if consumed in excess.

References

External links 
 United States Department of Agriculture Plants profile
 Low, Tim. Wild Herbs of Australia and New Zealand. Rev. ed. Angus and Robertson, 1991.  .
 
photo of herbarium specimen at Missouri Botanical Garden, collected in Brazil in 1995

radicata
Herbs
Leaf vegetables
Plants described in 1753
Taxa named by Carl Linnaeus
Flora of Europe